Kitchen Run is a stream in the U.S. state of Ohio.

Kitchen Run was named for one Mr. Kitchen, who killed a deer near the stream.

See also
List of rivers of Ohio

References

Rivers of Hocking County, Ohio
Rivers of Ohio